

Champions
World Series: St. Louis Cardinals over Philadelphia Athletics (4–3)

Awards and honors
MLB Most Valuable Player Award
 Lefty Grove, Philadelphia Athletics, P
 Frankie Frisch, St. Louis Cardinals, 2B

Statistical leaders

1MLB Pitching Triple Crown Winner

Major league baseball final standings

American League final standings

National League final standings

Negro leagues final standings

Negro National League final standings

† Columbus and HoD were not in the league but their games counted in the standings.

No official standings were published.
St. Louis was declared champion.

East (independent teams) final standings
A loose confederation of teams were gathered in the East to compete with the West, however East teams did not organize a formal league as the West did.

Events

January–April
January 24 – Following his release from the Cleveland Indians four days earlier, Joe Sewell joins the New York Yankees.
February 5 – Chicago Cubs outfielder Hack Wilson, who set National League marks for home runs (56) and runs batted in (191) the previous season, signs for $35,000. His RBI record is still standing today.
February 21 – The Chicago White Sox and New York Giants play a ten inning exhibition game at Buffalo Stadium in Houston, Texas. It is the first major league night game.
April 2 – Seventeen-year-old female Chattanooga Lookouts pitcher Jackie Mitchell takes the mound against the New York Yankees in a Spring training game. She strikes out the first two batters she faces- Babe Ruth and Lou Gehrig.
April 24:
Rogers Hornsby has three home runs and eight runs batted in during the Cubs' 10–6 victory over the Pittsburgh Pirates.
The New York Giants and Philadelphia Phillies play to a twelve inning 7–7 tie at the Polo Grounds.
April 27 – Boston Braves centerfielder Wally Berger ties a modern record with four assists in a 2–0 victory over the Philadelphia Phillies.
April 29 – Wes Ferrell pitches a no-hitter as the Cleveland Indians defeat the St. Louis Browns, 9–0.

May–August
May 26 – The New York Yankees defeat the Philadelphia Athletics 6–2, snapping the A's seventeen-game winning streak.
June 13 – Pittsburgh Pirates outfielder Adam Comorosky makes an unassisted double play in a 6–4 loss to the New York Giants. It is his second unassisted double play of the season (May 31 against the Chicago Cubs).
June 30 – The Philadelphia Athletics purchased Waite Hoyt from the Detroit Tigers. Despite a 3–8 record with Detroit, Hoyt wins his first four starts with the A's.
July 1 – Chuck Klein hit for a cycle as he bats in 5 runs in the Phillies 11-6 victory over the Chicago Cubs.
July 6 – The Philadelphia Athletics and Washington Senators play to a 0–0 eight inning tie.
July 7 – The Chicago White Sox defeat the St. Louis Browns 10–8 in twelve innings. No one on either team strikes out all game.
July 11 – The New York Giants gets 28 hits in a 23-8 victory over the Philadelphia Phillies in Game 1 of the doubleheader.
August 8 – Washington Senators pitcher Bobby Burke tosses a no-hitter in a 5–0 win over the Boston Red Sox.
August 18 – Claude Passeau pitches a 7-0 3-hit victory over the Boston Braves to end the Phillies' 14-game losing streak, the second longest in team history.
August 23 – Dick Coffman holds the Philadelphia Athletics to three hits on his way to a 1–0 victory, snapping Lefty Grove's sixteen-game winning streak. It is one of only two times the A's are shut out all season (the other being the 0–0 tie with the Senators on July 6).

September
September 1 – The New York Yankees sweep a doubleheader over the Boston Red Sox 11-3 and 5-1. But the big story was the home run race as Lou Gehrig hit 2 home runs to extended the American League lead in home runs to 2 over Babe Ruth who hit his 38th of the season.
September 3 – In a key pennant race, the Cincinnati Reds and the Chicago Cubs we're in a pitchers' dual between Owen Carroll and Pat Malone with the former having a slight edge. With two out in the tenth Taylor Douthit singled, stole second and scored home on an Edd Roush single to give the Reds a 3-2 victory over the Cubs.
September 6 – The New York Yankees scored 8 runs in the first inning en route to a 15-3 win over The Philadelphia Athletics.
September 8 – Hack Wilson of the Chicago Cubs who one year ago set 191 runs batted in to set an MLB record, who failed miserably this year, is exiled from the club and has been ordered to remove his belongings from the clubhouse.
September 16 – The Philadelphia A's defeat the Cleveland Indians 7–5 for their 100th victory of the season.
September 18 – Lefty Grove wins his 30th game of the season, 3–1 over the Chicago White Sox.
September 27:
In a doubleheader on the last day of the season, the St. Louis Cardinals win their 100th & 101st game of the season. The Cardinals spent eight games out of first place all season, and were never more than 1.5 games back.
Lou Gehrig drives in his 184th and 185th runs of the season in a 13-1 blowout victory over the American League champion Philadelphia A's. His 185 runs batted in during the season is still an American League record to this day.

October–December
October 1 – The Reigning World Champion Philadelphia A's take game one of the World Series, 6–2 over the team they defeated in the 1930 World Series, the St. Louis Cardinals.
October 2 – George Earnshaw grounds into a double play and strikes out to end two potential rallies for the Athletics. The Cards take game two of the Series, 2–0, behind Bill Hallahan's three hit performance.
October 5 – Burleigh Grimes gives up just two hits, including a two-run home run by Al Simmons in the ninth, to lead the Cardinals to a 5–2 victory in game three.
October 6 – George Earnshaw two hits the Cards to even the series at two games apiece.
October 7 – Bill Hallahan wins his second start of the series, 5–1.
October 9 – Sloppy play in the fifth and seventh innings leads to five unearned runs as the A's cruise to an 8–1 victory behind Lefty Grove.
October 10 – The St. Louis Cardinals defeat the Philadelphia Athletics, 4–2, in Game seven of the 1931 World Series, earning their second World Championship title. Bill Hallahan pitches the final out for the Cards to end the series with a 0.49 ERA.
October 31- The St. Louis Cardinals release pitcher Burleigh Grimes. Though Grimes would continue his MLB career, Grimes was the last pitcher who was legally allowed to throw a spitball.
November 30 – George Gibson comes out of retirement to manage the Pittsburgh Pirates. Ten years earlier, Gibson had led the Pirates to three first-division finishes.
December 4 – The Washington Senators trade Bump Hadley, Jackie Hayes and Sad Sam Jones to the Chicago White Sox for John Kerr and Carl Reynolds.
December 11 – The Chicago Cubs trade future Hall of Famer Hack Wilson and pitcher Bud Teachout to the St. Louis Cardinals in exchange for pitcher Burleigh Grimes. Wilson slumped to .261 with 13 home runs and 61 RBI, after he hit .356 with 56 HR and set a major league record with 191 RBI a year earlier.

Births

January
January 1 – Foster Castleman
January 3 – Laurie Ann Lee
January 6 – Fern Battaglia
January 6 – Dick Tomanek
January 7 – Ray Semproch
January 7 – Bunky Stewart
January 9 – Roy Dietzel
January 17 – Don Zimmer
January 18 – Barbara Hoffman
January 18 – Laurin Pepper
January 19 – Ed Sadowski
January 29 – Jim Baumer
January 29 – Hy Cohen
January 30 – Charlie Neal
January 31 – Hank Aguirre
January 31 – Ernie Banks
January 31 – Ruth Matlack

February
February 1 – Bob Smith
February 2 – Ted Tappe
February 3 – Glenn Cox
February 14 – Joe Caffie
February 16 – Maurice Fisher
February 22 – Chet Nichols Jr.
February 25 – Jim Dunn

March
March 7 – Dick Rand
March 12 – Chuck Oertel
March 13 – Don Bessent
March 13 – Carlos Pascual
March 18 – Shirley Stovroff
March 19 – Al Salerno
March 19 – Paul Smith
March 20 – Hank Izquierdo
March 23 – Stan Pitula
March 27 – Bobby Prescott
March 31 – Gene Snyder

April
April 1 – Betty Bays
April 5 – Fred Besana
April 6 – Sonny Senerchia
April 14 – Don Minnick
April 14 – Kal Segrist
April 15 – Ed Bailey
April 23 – Patricia Brown

May
May 6 – Willie Mays
May 10 – Bob Bowman
May 13 – Jack Shepard
May 14 – Terry Rukavina
May 15 – Ben Johnson
May 20 – Ken Boyer
May 25 – Jim Marshall
May 26 – Jim Frey
May 29 – John Baumgartner
May 31 – Betty McKenna

June
June 1 – Hal Smith
June 2 – Marshall Bridges
June 2 – Larry Jackson
June 6 – Rudy Árias
June 6 – Carl Willey
June 8 – Mary McCarty
June 9 – Bill Virdon
June 19 – Hank Mason
June 22 – Faye Throneberry
June 23 – Doris Cook
June 23 – Ulysses Hollimon
June 23 – Karl Spooner
June 27 – Chuck Coles
June 30 – Don Gross

July
July 3 – Ed Roebuck
July 4 – Bobby Malkmus
July 5 – Arnie Portocarrero
July 7 – Betty Francis
July 8 – Zach Monroe
July 8 – Eddie Phillips
July 9 – Gene Fodge
July 11 – Dick Gray 
July 12 – Paul Penson
July 15 – Bob Will
July 16 – Norm Sherry
July 23 – Joe Stanka
July 24 – Marguerite Kerrigan
July 28 – Gus Keriazakos
July 31 – Rip Coleman
July 31 – Joe Durham

August
August 7 – Ray Crone
August 7 – Motoshi Fujita
August 9 – Chuck Essegian
August 13 – William D. Mullins
August 16 – Don Rudolph
August 22 – Curt Barclay
August 27 – Joe Cunningham

September
September 3 – Tom Brewer
September 6 – Stan Pawloski
September 9 – Earl Averill Jr.
September 9 – Pete Naton
September 10 – Harry Anderson
September 13 – George Susce
September 14 – Don Williams
September 16 – Jerry Schypinski
September 19 – Ron Shoop
September 22 – Ken Aspromonte
September 24 – Mike Krsnich
September 29 – Margaret Russo
September 30 – Helen Ketola

October
October 1 – Fred Kipp
October 3 – Bob Skinner
October 4 – Joe Kirrene
October 8 – Patricia Courtney
October 11 – Gary Blaylock
October 13 – Eddie Mathews
October 15 – Gail Harris 
October 16 – Janet Rumsey
October 16 – Dave Sisler
October 17 – Dan Porter 
October 18 – Andy Carey
October 19 – Don Leppert 
October 20 – Mickey Mantle
October 23 – Jim Bunning
October 25 – Dick Murphy 
October 28 – Gair Allie

November
November 1 – Russ Kemmerer
November 4 – Marie Mansfield
November 5 – Bill Guilfoile
November 9 – Whitey Herzog
November 11 – Dutch Dotterer
November 16 – Frank Bolling
November 22 – Neal Hertweck
November 24 – Dick Phillips
November 25 – John Pyecha
November 29 – Paul Pettit
November 30 – Ed Mayer

December
December 3 – Bill Harris
December 4 – Jean Buckley
December 10 – Rudy Hernández
December 10 – Bob Roselli
December 13 – Don Erickson
December 13 – Bubba Morton
December 15 – Sammy Esposito
December 16 – Neil Chrisley
December 20 – Julio Bécquer
December 24 – Evelio Hernández
December 30 – Frank Torre

Deaths

January
January 4 – Roger Connor, 73, Hall of Fame first baseman, an outstanding slugger for the New York Giants who posted a .317 career average and held major league home run record until 1921, ranking first all-time in triples and second in hits, runs and RBI and upon retirement, while leading the National League in batting, hits, HRs, RBI and doubles once each, and hitting the first grand slam in major league history.
January 14 – Hardy Richardson, 75, second baseman and outfielder who batted .300 seven times, led National League in hits and home runs with the 1886 Detroit team, and also was among to first ten players to reach 1,500 hits.

February
February 11 – Charles Dryden, 71, sportswriter who made his name with an idiosyncratic style that emphasized personalities in the game for the many nicknames he created, including "The Peerless Leader", "The Old Roman", "Hitless Wonders".
February 13 – Dick Phelan, 76, second baseman for the Baltimore Monumentals, Buffalo Bisons and St. Louis Maroons between the 1884 and 1885 seasons.
February 15 – Billy Kinloch, 56, third baseman for the 1895 St. Louis Browns.

March
March 17 – Tom Gunning, 69, catcher who played from 1884 through 1889 for the Boston Beaneaters and the Philadelphia Quakers/Athletics teams.
March 19 – Joe Gannon, 54, pitcher for the 1898 St. Louis Browns.
March 27 – Ernest Barnard, 56, who served as general manager of the Cleveland Indians from 1903 to 1926, and effectively ran the team following the death of owner James Dunn in 1922, while becoming the second president of the American League in following the retirement of Ban Johnson in 1927.
March 28 – Ban Johnson, 67, founder and president of the American League from 1901 to 1927, who played major role in eradicating rowdyism prevalent in the game of the 1890s, and fiercely protected authority of umpires.

April
April 10 – Mickey Hughes, 64, pitcher from 1888 to 1890 for the Brooklyn Bridegrooms and Philadelphia Athletics.
April 16 – Bucky Veil, 49, pitcher for the 1903-1904 Pittsburgh Pirates. first World Series relief pitcher
April 17 – George Daisy, 74, left fielder for the 1884 Altoona Mountain City.
April 22 – Bill Otey, 44, pitcher for the Pittsburgh Pirates and Washington Senators during three seasons between 1907 and 1911.
April 25 – August "Garry" Herrmann, 71, owner of the Cincinnati Reds from 1902 to 1927, who led the sport as chairman of the National Commission from 1903 to 1920, and ensured that the World Series would be held annually.
April 28 – Mike Mattimore, 72, pitcher/outfielder for four seasons from 1887 to 1890.
April 29 – Jimmy McAleer, 66, center fielder for the Cleveland Spiders who later managed American League teams in Cleveland, St. Louis and Washington, and also was part owner of the Boston Red Sox in the 1910s.
April 29 – John Waltz, 71, manager for the Baltimore Orioles of the National League in 1892, and also an American Association executive.

May
May 5 – John Riddle, 67, catcher/outfielder in 11 games from 1889 to 1890 for the  Washington Nationals and the Philadelphia Athletics.
May 8 – George Noftsker, 71, outfielder/catcher for the 1884 Altoona Mountain City.
May 14 – Doc Newton, 53, pitcher for the Cincinnati Reds, Brooklyn Superbas and New York Highlanders in part of seven seasons spanning 1901–1909.
May 17 – Charlie Ferguson, 56, pitcher for the 1901 Chicago Orphans who later umpired 122 games in the American League in 1913 and 1914.
May 18 – Charlie Hamburg, 64, outfielder for the 1890 Louisville Colonels.
May 23 – Bob Miller, 62, pitcher/outfielder from 1890 to 1891 for the Rochester Broncos and the Washington Statesmen.

June
June 8 – Ed Ford, 69, infielder for the 1884 Richmond Virginians.
June 13 – Bill O'Hara, 47, Canadian center fielder who played from 1909 to 1910 with the New York Giants and St. Louis Cardinals.
June 16 – Andy Sommerville, 55, pitcher for the 1894 Brooklyn Grooms.
June 23 – Clarence Cross, 75, shortstop for the Altoona Mountain City, Philadelphia Keystones, Kansas City Cowboys and New York Metropolitans in a span of four seasons from 1884 to 1887.
June 25 – Con Lucid, 57, Irish pitcher who played from 1893 through 1897 with the Louisville Colonels, Brooklyn Grooms, Philadelphia Phillies, and St. Louis Browns.
June 30 – Lee Dressen, 41, shortstop for the 1914 St. Louis Cardinals and the 1918 Detroit Tigers.

July
July 11 – Alexander Donoghue, 67, outfielder/shortstop for the 1891 Philadelphia Phillies.
July 14 – Babe Danzig, 44, first baseman for the 1909 Boston Red Sox.
July 26 – Ben Ellis, 61, infielder for the 1896 Philadelphia Phillies.
July 29 – Conny Doyle, 69, outfielder from 1883 to 1884 for the Philadelphia Quakers and Pittsburgh Alleghenys.

August
August 14 – Bob Edmundson, 52, outfielder who played for the Washington Senators between the 1906 and 1908 seasons.
August 30 – Tinsley Ginn, 39, outfielder who played with the 1914 Cleveland Naps.

September
September 11 – Joe Marshall, 55, outfielder for the 1903 Pittsburgh Pirates and the 1906 St. Louis Cardinals.
September 11 – Carl Sitton, 49, pitcher for the  1909 Cleveland Naps.
September 12 – Pop Dillon, 57, first baseman who played with the Pittsburgh Pirates, Detroit Tigers and Brooklyn Superbas in parts of five seasons spanning 1899–1904.
September 21 – Walter Byrne, 82, American Association umpire.

October
October   2 – George Bradley, 79, St. Louis Brown Stockings pitcher who hurled the first no-hitter in the National's League 1876 inaugural season, also winning 45 games and leading the league with a 1.23 ERA, while setting a major league season record with 16 shutouts tied only by Grover Alexander 40 years later.
October   6 – John Kirby, 66, National League pitcher from 1884 to 1888 for the Kansas City Cowboys, St. Louis Maroons, Indianapolis Hoosiers and Cleveland Blues.
October 14 – Al Niehaus, 32, first baseman who played with the Pittsburgh Pirates and Cincinnati Reds during the 1925 season.
October 15 – Oscar Graham, 53, pitcher for the 1907 Washington Senators.
October 16 – Charles Murphy, 63, owner of the Chicago Cubs from 1906 to 1913.
October 24 – Pete Lamer, 57, catcher for the 1902 Chicago Orphans and the 1907 Cincinnati Reds.
October 26 – Charles Comiskey, 72, Hall of Fame first baseman/manager and owner of the Chicago White Sox since the team's formation in 1901, during which time they won four American League pennants and two World Series (1906, 1917), who previously became the first manager to win four consecutive pennants, with the St. Louis Browns (1885–1888), including the 1886 World Series title. and posted the highest winning percentage (.608) among managers of at least 1200 games.
October 30 – Joe Hornung, 74, solid left fielder and speedy base runner, who played for the Buffalo Bisons, Boston Red Caps/Beaneaters, Baltimore Orioles and New York Giants in a span of 11 seasons between 1879 and 1890.
October 30 – Jim Tyng, 75, known as the first baseball player to wear a catcher's mask while playing for Harvard University (1877), who later pitched in the National League for the Boston Red Caps (1879) and the Philadelphia Phillies (1888).

November
November  6 – Jack Chesbro, 57, Hall of Fame pitcher; a five-time 20-games winner in 12 seasons who led both leagues in wins and winning percentage, topped the National League in shutouts twice, guided the Pittsburgh Pirates to their first pennant in 1901 and the World Series in 1902, and holds modern records with 41 wins and 48 complete games while pitching for the 1904 New York Highlanders of the American League, though he is best remembered for the wild pitch he tossed to score the Boston Red Sox pennant-clinching run on the final day of that season.
November  8 – Sam Brown, 53, catcher for the 1906/1907 Boston Beaneaters/Doves of the National League. 
November  8 – Frank Meinke, 68, pitcher who played from 1884 to 1885 for the Detroit Wolverines of the National League.
November  9 – Chris Fulmer, 73, National League catcher who played with the Washington Nationals and the Baltimore Orioles in parts of three seasons spanning 1884–1889.
November 24 – Fred Lake, 65, Canadian catcher for the Boston Beaneaters, Louisville Colonels, Pittsburgh Pirates and Boston Doves in five season between 1891 and 1910, who also managed the Boston Red Sox in part of the 1909 season.
November 27 – Jack Burdock, 79, National Association second baseman for three teams from 1872 to 1875, and then part of the National League's inaugural year in 1876 while playing for the Hartford Dark Blues, who later played 14 more seasons for the Boston Red Stockings/Beaneaters and the Brooklyn Bridegrooms between 1877 and 1881, became the third out of the first triple play in National League history during the 1876 season, and also batted the first unassisted triple play two years later.

December
December  8 – Jack Bellman, 67, backup catcher for the 1889 St. Louis Browns.
December 10 – Tex Covington, 44, pitcher for the Detroit Tigers from 1911 to 1912.
December 11 – George Harper, 65, pitcher who played with the Philadelphia Phillies in 1894 and the Brooklyn Bridegrooms in 1896.
December 13 – Al Schulz, 42, pitcher for the New York Highlanders/Yankees, Buffalo Buffeds/Blues and Cincinnati Reds from 1912 through 1916.
December 18 – C. V. Matteson, 70, who pitched one game for the 1884 St. Louis Maroons of the Union Association.

References